Huber is a surname of German origin.

Huber may also refer to:

Places in the United States
Huber, Georgia
Huber, Indiana
Huber, Michigan
Huber, Montana
Huber Heights, Ohio and Huber Ridge, Ohio
Huber, Oregon
Huber, Texas

Other uses
 Huber's equation, basic formula in elastic material tension calculations
 Huber loss, loss function used in probabilities and modelling systems
 Huber Mansion, historical residence in Istanbul, Turkey
J.M. Huber Corporation
Joseph Huber Brewing Company

See also 
 Hubersdorf, a municipality in Switzerland
 Hubert